Byron Black and Jonathan Stark were the defending champions, but lost in the final this year.

Jacco Eltingh and Paul Haarhuis won in the final 3–6, 7–6, 7–5, against Black and Stark.

Seeds
All seeds receive a bye into the second round.

Draw

Finals

Top half

Bottom half

External links
 1994 Paris Open Doubles draw

Doubles